is one of the 16 wards of the city of Nagoya in Aichi Prefecture, Japan. , the ward had an estimated population of 82,939 and a population density of 10,757 persons per km². The total area was 7.71 km².

Geography
Higashi Ward is located in the center of Nagoya city. It is the smallest of the wards of Nagoya in terms of geographic area.

Surrounding municipalities
Chikusa Ward
Kita Ward
Moriyama Ward
Naka Ward

History
Higashi Ward was one of the original four wards of the city of Nagoya, established on April 1, 1908. Most of the area was completely destroyed during the Bombing of Nagoya in World War II. After the war, the layout of the streets was changed to a grid pattern, with wide streets serving as firebreaks.

Economy
Higashi Ward has the headquarters of Tōkai Television Broadcasting as well as the NHK Nagoya Broadcasting Station.

Education
Aichi University - Kurumamichi campus
Nagoya University – Medical School
Nagoya Future Culture College

Transportation

Rail
JR Central - Chūō Main Line
 
Meitetsu – Seto Line
 -  - 
Nagoya Municipal Subway – Higashiyama Line
  - 
Nagoya Municipal Subway – Sakura-dōri Line
  - 
Nagoya Municipal Subway – Meijō Line
  –  
Nagoya Guideway Bus – Yutorito Line
  –  –

Highways
Ring Route (Nagoya Expressway)
Route 1 (Nagoya Expressway) 
National Route 19 
National Route 41

Local attractions

Aichi Arts Center
Oasis 21
 Ōzone Oshitayashiki with Tokugawa Garden and Tokugawa Art Museum 
 Aoi Oshitayashiki, former Tokugawa residence 
Nagoya Dome
Cultural Path
Cultural Path Futaba Museum
Hori Art Museum
Morimura Museum of Yamatoe Art
Nagoya City Performing Arts Center
Catholic Chikaramachi Church
Bank of Tokyo-Mitsubishi UFJ Money Museum
Nagoya Ceramics Hall
Yamazaki Mazak Museum of Art
ÆON MALL NAGOYADOMEMAE

Notable people from Higashi-ku, Nagoya
Keiko Takeshita – actress

References

External links

City of Nagoya website - English

Wards of Nagoya